Canice is an Irish male given name, which is an anglicisation of the Gaelic name Cainnech or Coinneach, meaning "handsome".  Kenneth is a Scottish name of the same origin.  The name may refer to:

Cainnech of Aghaboe (515–600), Irish saint
Canice Brennan (born 1972), Irish hurler
Canice Hickey (born 1982), Irish hurler

References

Irish masculine given names